John William Snyder (October 6, 1886 in Lincoln, Pennsylvania – December 13, 1981 in Brownsville, Pennsylvania) was a professional baseball player who played the position of catcher in seven games for the 1917 Brooklyn Robins. At the time of his death, he was the oldest living former major league player.

External links

1886 births
1981 deaths
People from Lincoln, Pennsylvania
Major League Baseball catchers
Brooklyn Robins players
Baseball players from Pennsylvania
Minor league baseball managers
Saginaw Ducks players
London Tecumsehs (baseball) players
Joplin Miners players
Maysville Rivermen players